Joseph Frederick Cone (May 1848 – April 13, 1909) was an American Major League Baseball player for the 1871 Boston Red Stockings.

Born in Rockford, Illinois, Cone was the first baseman for the Rockford Forest Citys in 1868 and 1869 before moving to the outfield in 1870. He signed with the Boston Red Stockings in 1871. In his only major league season, he batted .260 with 16 runs batted in.

Cone later became a hotel clerk. He died of apoplexy in Chicago.

References

External links

1848 births
1909 deaths
19th-century baseball players
Major League Baseball left fielders
Rockford Forest Citys (NABBP) players
Boston Red Stockings players
New Bedford (minor league baseball) players
New Haven (minor league baseball) players
Hartford (minor league baseball) players
Baseball players from Illinois
Sportspeople from Rockford, Illinois